Sandawe may refer to:

Sandawe people, of central Tanzania
Sandawe language, spoken by the Sandawe people